The Geelong Independent is a local free weekly newspaper delivered to houses in the Geelong region in Victoria. 

The newspaper was first published on 31 October 1986 and was started by a group of local businessmen - mostly real estate agents and car yard salesmen - unhappy with the cost of advertising in existing local publications. They sold their share to the Star News Group managed by fourth generation owner, Paul Thomas, in the mid-2000s with a gradual takeover by the family owned newspaper company.

The managing editor is Tony Galpin, a former senior journalist at the Independent before taking over as editor. He formerly worked on the Wimmera Mail Times.

See also 
 Geelong News
 Geelong Advertiser

Mass media in Geelong
Newspapers published in Victoria (Australia)
Weekly newspapers published in Australia